Marvin E. Pratt (born May 26, 1944) is an American politician who served as acting mayor of Milwaukee in 2004 and as interim Milwaukee County Executive in 2011. He was the first African-American to act as mayor of Milwaukee.

Early life
Pratt was born on May 26, 1944 to Leon Pratt Sr., a United States Naval officer, and Mildred Joyce Pratt in Dallas, Texas. While living in Dallas, he attended a local Catholic school with his twin sister, Marielle, until his family moved to Milwaukee, Wisconsin, in 1959, following the death of his father in a car accident in 1949. He has two sisters, Gwen and Reba, and a brother, Leon Jr.. Pratt graduated from North Division High School in 1962 and immediately joined the United States Air Force. He was stationed in the Libyan desertduring the Vietnam War and was honorably discharged in the mid 60s. When he returned to Milwaukee after his service, he enrolled in Marquette University and gained a degree in political science in 1972. Pratt became an intern for mayor Henry Maier and began climbing a ladder of local government jobs.

Political life
Pratt ran for an aldermanic seat in 1984, a tense time for race relations in the city. During this year, there was a racial divide over whether or not to rename what was then known as North 3rd Street to Dr. Martin Luther King Drive. Despite his loss to Roy B. Nabors in 1984, he ran for the same seat and won in a 1986 special election. Upon his election in 1986, Pratt was appointed to the Finance and Personnel Committee, where he continuously served as member and eventually chairman from 1996 to 2000. One of his notable victories while serving on the Common Council was the creation of the Resident's Preference Program in 1991, as described on the official website of the City of Milwaukee: 

This program is still in effect today, and has been expanded to include private businesses.

In 2000, Pratt was elected the president of the Common Council: "...he was motivated to run after seeing so many vacant boarded up houses never changing in Milwaukee neighborhoods. The city was divided and the city workforce and federal departments didn't represent Milwaukee's population."

When mayor John Norquist stepped down in 2004 three months before his term expired, Pratt became acting mayor. He was the first African-American to act as mayor of Milwaukee. Pratt ran in a primary election for the mayoral seat and finished first from a field of thirteen candidates during the primary. He lost his bid to Tom Barrett in the 2004 general election.

On February 4, 2011, Pratt was sworn in as interim Milwaukee County Executive. Appointed by County Board Chairman Lee Holloway, he filled the unexpired term of former Milwaukee County Executive Scott Walker, who was elected governor of Wisconsin, until the special Spring Election held on April 5, 2011. Upon being sworn in, Pratt became the first person to have acted as both Milwaukee Mayor and Milwaukee County Executive.

On April 5, 2011, Chris Abele defeated Republican challenger Jeff Stone, capturing over 61% of the vote and succeeded Pratt to serve out the remainder of then-County Executive Scott Walker's original term.

Personal life and legacy
Pratt married Dianne Sherrill in 1971. They have two children, Michael Pratt and Andrea Pratt. They have five grandchildren.

Pratt was a major in the United States Army Reserves.

In October 2015, the Milwaukee Public School Board passed a resolution to rename Silver Spring Elementary after Pratt.

On July 15, 2016, the school was officially renamed Marvin E. Pratt Elementary School.

On December 5th, 2022, Pratt’s daughter, Andrea announced her candidacy for Alderwoman of the First District, the seat her father held for nearly 18 years.

Electoral history
2004 Race for Mayor (Milwaukee)
Tom Barrett (D), 54%
Marvin Pratt (D) (inc.), 46%

References

1944 births
20th-century American politicians
21st-century American politicians
African-American mayors in Wisconsin
Living people
Marquette University alumni
Mayors of Milwaukee
Military personnel from Dallas
Military personnel from Wisconsin
Milwaukee Common Council members
Milwaukee County Executives
North Division High School (Milwaukee) alumni
Politicians from Dallas
Wisconsin Democrats
20th-century African-American politicians
21st-century African-American politicians